This is a list of intra-Israelite conflicts.

Biblical period 

 Eli-Pincus conflict (approx 1400 BCE) –  a civil war broke out between Eli son of Yafni, of the line of Ithamar, and the sons of Pincus (Phinehas), because Eli son of Yafni resolved to usurp the High Priesthood from the descendants of Pincus.

Second Temple and Roman period 

Hasmonean-Samaritan conflict (113–110 BCE) – Beginning in 113 BCE, Hyrcanus began an extensive military campaign against Samaria. Ultimately, Samaria was overrun and totally destroyed. The inhabitants of Samaria were then put into slavery.   After these victories, Hyrcanus went north towards Shechem and Mount Gerizim. The city of Shechem was reduced to a village and the Samaritan Temple on Mount Gerizim was destroyed. This military action against Shechem has been dated archaeologically around 111–110 BCE.

Jewish-Samaritan conflict (1st century CE) – Under the leadership of two Zealots, Eleazar and Alexander, they invaded Samaria and began a massacre. Cumanus led most of his troops against the militants, killing many and taking others prisoner, and the Jewish leaders from Jerusalem were subsequently able to calm most of the others, but a state of guerrilla warfare persisted.
Sicarii and Zealot rebels (6–73 CE) – Sicarii were a splinter group of the Jewish Zealots who used violence against Jews and Romans in the Roman province of Judea.  Much of what is known about the Sicarii comes from the Antiquities of the Jews and The Jewish War by Josephus, who wrote that the Sicarii agreed to release the kidnapped secretary of Eleazar, governor of the Temple precincts, in exchange for the release of ten captured assassins. The Sicarii were involved in the murder of High Priest Jonathan and also committed a series of atrocities in an attempt to incite the population into war against Rome. In one account, given in the Talmud, they destroyed the city's food supply, using starvation to force the people to fight against the Roman siege, instead of negotiating peace. Josephus also wrote that the Sicarii raided nearby Hebrew villages including Ein Gedi, where they massacred 700 women and children.
Persecution of Ebionites and Nazarenes (70 CE – 135 CE) – Ebionites were in conflict with the Jewish followers of Bar Kochba for refusing to recognize his messianic claims. According to the Haran Gawaita, Nasoraean Mandaeans fled Jerusalem before its fall in 70 CE due to persecution by a faction of Jews.

References

Israel-related lists